The yellowhead or mōhua (Mohoua ochrocephala) is a small insectivorous passerine bird endemic to the South Island of New Zealand. Once a common forest bird, its numbers declined drastically after the introduction of rats and stoats, and it is now near threatened.

Name 
The yellowhead was known in the 19th century as the "bush canary", after its trilling song. Today it is often known by its Māori name mōhua in New Zealand English, but Māori also knew it as mōhoua and houa. Recent classification places this species and its close relative, the whitehead, in the family Mohouidae.

Distribution 
The yellowhead and the whitehead have allopatric distributions as, conversely, the latter is found only in the North Island and several small islands surrounding it. Although abundant in the 19th century, particularly in southern beech forests on the South Island and Stewart Island / Rakiura, mōhua declined dramatically in the early 20th century due to the introduction of black rats and mustelids; nesting in tree holes makes them more vulnerable to predators.

Today they have vanished from almost all of the South Island's forests and exist in less than 5% of their original range. On mainland South Island there is currently a small population of mōhua in the Marlborough Sounds and around Arthur's Pass, but a quarter of the population lives in the beech forests of the Catlins. The mōhua number about 5000.

Conservation

In New Zealand, mōhua have the status of a protected threatened endemic species. Conservation efforts are being made to ensure its survival and mōhua populations have been established on several predator-free offshore islands, such as Breaksea Island in Fiordland and Ulva Island. Birds have been captive-bred at Orana Park in Christchurch.

In 2003, 39 mōhua were translocated from Breaksea Island to predator-free Codfish Island / Whenua Hou, and more were introduced to Whenua Hōu from the Catlins in 2018, increasing the island's population to about 1000. More releases are planned to islands in Fiordland.

Pest control efforts by the Department of Conservation have managed to stabilise some mainland mōhua populations. For example, where biodegradable 1080 poison was used to control rats in the Dart valley, there was a more than 80% survival rate, compared with just 10% in untreated areas. The population of mōhua in the Landsborough valley has increased four-fold since 1998, thanks to an intensive programme of pest control, including aerial 1080. The population is now strong enough for birds to be transferred out to establish a new population on Resolution Island. Similar aerial 1080 operations in the Catlins and the Hurunui, Hawdon and Eglinton valleys have had equally encouraging results. DOC and TBfree New Zealand noted in March 2014 that there was a significant repopulation in the Catlins of other avian species, including bellbird and tomtit due to the reduction of predators.

Popular culture 
Since the redesign of New Zealand's currency in 1991 a yellowhead has appeared on the reverse side of the New Zealand $100 note.

References

Literature

External links
 Mōhua Charitable Trust
 

Mohoua
Birds of the South Island
Birds described in 1789
Taxa named by Johann Friedrich Gmelin
Endemic birds of New Zealand